The women's 200 metre freestyle swimming events for the 2016 Summer Paralympics take place at the Rio Olympic Stadium from 8 to 15 September. A total of two events were contested for two different classifications.

Competition format
Each event consists of two rounds: heats and final. The top eight swimmers overall in the heats progress to the final. If there are eight or fewer swimmers in an event, no heats are held and all swimmers qualify for the final.

Results

S5

20:08 8 September 2016:

S14

18:37 11 September 2016:

References

Swimming at the 2016 Summer Paralympics